Jayasinghe Muhandiram Donald Dissanayake (known as Donald Dissanayake) is a Sri Lankan politician and was a former Member of Parliament representing the Gampaha District, Sri Lanka.

See also
Gampaha Electoral District

References

Living people
Sri Lankan Buddhists
United National Party politicians
Members of the 9th Parliament of Sri Lanka
Sinhalese politicians
Year of birth missing (living people)